Meshal Mubarak Budawood (born February 25, 1982) is a Qatari footballer who is a left-back defender . He is a member of the Qatar national football team. One of the best prospects of Qatari football, he was loaned to Feyenoord Rotterdam from Qatar SC in 2003.

Club career statistics
Statistics accurate as of 27 May 2012

1Includes Emir of Qatar Cup.

2Includes Sheikh Jassem Cup.

3Includes AFC Champions League.

References

External links

FIFA.com profile
Goalzz.com profile

1982 births
Living people
Al-Gharafa SC players
Al-Wakrah SC players
Al-Rayyan SC players
Qatar SC players
Feyenoord players
2000 AFC Asian Cup players
2007 AFC Asian Cup players
Al Ahli SC (Doha) players
Qatari footballers
Qatari expatriate footballers
Qatar international footballers
Qatar Stars League players
Footballers at the 2002 Asian Games
Expatriate footballers in the Netherlands
Qatari expatriate sportspeople in the Netherlands
Association football defenders
Asian Games competitors for Qatar